Sergey Ulegin (born October 8, 1977 in Engels) is a Russian canoeist who has been competing since 2001 He won a silver in the men's C-2 500 m event at the 2008 Summer Olympics in Beijing.

At the ICF Canoe Sprint World Championships, Ulegin has won four medals with two golds (C-2 500 m: 2006, C-4 200 m: 2002), a silver (C-4 200 m: 2009), and a bronze (C-2 500 m: 2002).

Doping controversy
At the 2003 ICF Canoe Sprint World Championships in Gainesville, Georgia in the United States, Ulegin initially won golds in the C-4 200 m and C-4 500 m events, and a silver in the C-2 500 m event. However, Ulegin tested positive for doping at those championships. A November 29, 2003 International Canoe Federation (ICF) Executive Committee meeting in Prague, Czech Republic confirmed that Ulegin's B-sample was positive like the A-test he gave in Gainesville. This led the ICF to issue a two-year suspension for Ulegin from September 14, 2003 to September 14, 2005. Ulegin became the second sprint canoeist  stripped of his medals for doping either at the Summer Olympics or the World championships as a result. Ulegin served his two-year suspension, missing the 2004 Summer Olympics in Athens and the 2005 ICF Canoe Sprint World Championships in Zagreb, Croatia.

References

External links

1977 births
Living people
People from Engels, Saratov Oblast
Canoeists at the 2008 Summer Olympics
Doping cases in canoeing
Olympic canoeists of Russia
Olympic silver medalists for Russia
Russian male canoeists
Russian sportspeople in doping cases
Olympic medalists in canoeing
ICF Canoe Sprint World Championships medalists in Canadian
Medalists at the 2008 Summer Olympics
Saratov State Agrarian University alumni
Sportspeople from Saratov Oblast